William Holder (1616–1698) was an English clergyman.

William Holder may also refer to:
William Holder (rugby) (fl. 1907–1941), known as Billy, English rugby union and rugby league footballer
William Dunbar Holder (1824–1900), Confederate politician
Will Holder (designer) (born 1969), British designer and artist
Will Holder (American football) (born 1975), American football player
Will Holder (rugby union) (born 1991), American rugby sevens player

See also
 Bill Houlder (born 1967), Canadian ice hockey player